Shaman is a steel roller coaster located at Gardaland, Castelnuovo del Garda near Verona, Italy. Manufactured by Vekoma, the roller coaster originally opened as Magic Mountain, featuring Arrow Dynamics trains, which were replaced with newer Vekoma trains in 2008.
A VR experience and additional new theming was added to the ride in 2017, and it was renamed Shaman. The VR was removed the following year. In November 2020, Gardaland began removing parts of the track. It was replaced with new track pieces, similar to what was done on Python at Efteling, to improve the smoothness of the ride experience. The supports & other theming items were also repainted to improve the theming of the area.

Gallery

References

External links

 

Roller coasters in Italy
Roller coasters operated by Merlin Entertainments
Roller coasters introduced in 1985
Gardaland rides
1985 establishments in Italy